The Atlantika Mountains, also known as the Alantika Mountains, are an extension of the Cameroon line of volcanic mountains, spanning the border between Nigeria and Cameroon. They lie to the southeast of Yola, the capital of Adamawa State in Nigeria, and southwest of the Mandara mountains. In Cameroon, they are part of the North Region.
They are north of the Adamawa Plateau and west of the Faro National Park in Cameroon.
The range includes a belt of volcanoes, most of which are inactive.

The line of mountains of which the Atlantika range is a part were taken as a natural boundary between Nigeria and Cameroon by the colonial powers.
The Koma people took refuge in the mountains in the last half of the 19th century, apparently to avoid paying taxes to the colonial  government. They remained unnoticed until 1980, when they were found by an Indian schoolteacher who was working for the government.

Alantika means where Allah hasn't yet arrived in the Kanuri language, due to the Koma people keeping their own religions, despite being mostly surrounded by Muslims.

References

Mountain ranges of Cameroon
Mountain ranges of Nigeria
Cameroonian Highlands forests